Evonne Fay Goolagong Cawley  (née Goolagong; born 31 July 1951) is an Australian former world No. 1 tennis player. Goolagong was one of the world's leading players in the 1970s and early 1980s.

At the age of 19, she won the French Open singles and the Australian Open doubles championships (the latter with Margaret Court). She won the women's singles tournament at Wimbledon in 1971. In 1980, she became the first mother to win Wimbledon for 66 years. Goolagong went on to win 14 Grand Slam tournament titles: seven in singles (four at the Australian Open, two at Wimbledon and one at the French Open), six in women's doubles, and one in mixed doubles. She represented Australia in three Fed Cup competitions, winning the title in 1971, 1973 and 1974, and was Fed Cup captain for three consecutive years. After retiring from professional tennis in 1983, Goolagong played in senior invitational competitions, endorsed a variety of products, worked as a touring professional, and held sports-related leadership roles.

Goolagong was named Australian of the Year in 1971. She was appointed as a Member of the Order of the British Empire in 1972 and as an Officer of the Order of Australia in 1982. Goolagong was inducted into the Sport Australia Hall of Fame in 1985, the International Tennis Hall of Fame in 1988, and the Aboriginal Sporting Hall of Fame in 1989. She leads the Goolagong National Development Camp for Indigenous boys and girls, which encourages Indigenous youth to stay in school.

Early life
Evonne is the third of eight children from an Australian Aboriginal (Wiradjuri) family. Her father, Ken Goolagong, was an itinerant sheep shearer and her mother, Melinda, was a homemaker. Evonne was born in Griffith, New South Wales, and grew up in the small country town of Barellan. Despite the widespread disadvantage and prejudice Aboriginal people experienced in Australia, Goolagong was able to play tennis in Barellan from childhood, thanks to an area resident, Bill Kurtzman, who saw her peering through the fence at the local courts and encouraged her to come in and play.

In 1965, Vic Edwards, the proprietor of a tennis school in Sydney, was tipped off by two of his assistants, travelled to Barellan to take a look at the young Goolagong, and immediately saw her potential. He persuaded her parents to allow her to move to Sydney, where she attended Willoughby Girls High School. There, she completed her School Certificate in 1968 and, at the same time, lived with the family of Edwards, who had become her legal guardian, coach, and manager.

Career and Grand Slam tournament success
With seven championships, Goolagong is 12th on the women's list of all-time singles Grand Slam winners, and ended her career with 86 singles titles. She took singles and doubles titles at the Australian Open and Wimbledon and singles and mixed doubles titles at the French Open. She never won the US Open. She won seven Grand Slam singles titles in her career, reaching a total of 18 Grand Slam singles finals.

During the 1970s, she played in 17 Grand Slam singles finals, a period record for any player, man or woman. From her first Grand Slam singles final appearance in January 1971, to December 1977 when she won her last Grand Slam title of the 1970s, she played in 21 Grand Slam events. Her only four defeats prior to the finals came at the 1972 US Open in the third round; 1974 Wimbledon, where she was defeated in the quarterfinals; and at the semifinal stage at both Roland Garros and Wimbledon in 1973. To start the decade, she was defeated at the 1970 Australian Open in the quarterfinals and in the second round of the 1970 Wimbledon. In 1971, 1975, 1976 and 1977, Goolagong reached the final of every Grand Slam championship in which she competed.

Between 1973 and 1977, she reached the final of almost every Grand Slam singles event she entered. The exceptions were: Roland Garros, where she lost to Margaret Court in the semifinals in 1973; and Wimbledon, where she played in only two finals in that period, 1975 and 1976, losing both; she lost in 1973 to eventual champion Billie Jean King in the semifinals; and in 1974 to Australian Kerry Melville at the quarterfinal stage; she did not enter in 1977, the year her daughter was born. Also in 1974, she teamed up with Peggy Michel to win the ladies' doubles title. She won the women's doubles title at the Australian Open five times and in Roland Garros once, as well as mixed doubles at Roland Garros once.

Following her victory at the season-ending WTA Championships in 1976—known at the time as the Virginia Slims Championships—her seventh tournament victory of the year, Goolagong continued to play on the WTA Tour until 1983, but never again played a full season. After her victory over Chris Evert in the WTA Championships, she only played in three competitive tournaments for the remainder of 1976, losing in both finals to Evert (Wimbledon and US Open) and the Sydney quarterfinals in November, which she played while four months pregnant. She focused instead on WTT Team Tennis and exhibition events.

Goolagong realised during the 1976 US Open final that she was pregnant and after one more tournament for the year, she did not play again on the regular tour until the summer of 1977, continuing through to Wimbledon 1978. 1976 had been her best season to date, winning seven titles, rising to number one in the world and losing only to Chris Evert, which she did five times and once to Dianne Fromholtz in Sydney, which she played in the second trimester of her pregnancy. No other players were able to score a victory over her in the year.

After attempting a comeback in the summer of 1977, Goolagong decided to wait for the Australian season beginning later in the year for a full return. Her return to the tour proper kick-started a highly successful run of play, during which she won ten tournaments including the Australian Open in a run of five consecutive tournament wins and reached the final in two others, including the season-ending WTA Championships, where she lost to Martina Navratilova.

At the Virginia Slims of Boston in March 1978, Goolagong beat both Navratilova and Evert back-to-back to win the title. It was her only post pregnancy victory over Navratilova and one of only two she scored over Evert. Prior to her first pregnancy, Goolagong led Navratilova 11–4 in their rivalry, but she lost 11 of their 12 matches after her daughter was born to trail 12–15 at the end of her career. From being un-ranked at the beginning of her return, Goolagong's ranking rose to No. 3 in the world, but during Wimbledon 1978, a career-threatening ankle injury forced her to miss the remainder of 1978, other than the exhibition Emeron Cup event played in December, where she played with her ankle heavily strapped and lost to both Navratilova and Virginia Wade in straight sets. She did not return to competitive play until March 1979, when she won four tournaments and ended the year ranked No. 4 in the world.

Injuries and illness at the beginning of 1980 kept her away from the tour for many weeks in the first six months of the year and only reached four finals, but she returned in triumph at Wimbledon, yet only played three further tournaments and the exhibition Lion's Cup for the remainder of the year after her final Grand Slam victory. For her Wimbledon triumph, Goolagong beat four top ten players (Hana Mandlíková #9, Wendy Turnbull #6, Tracy Austin #2 and Chris Evert #3), the only champion in Wimbledon history to do so. She also beat two former Grand Slam finalists in earlier rounds, Sharon Walsh and Betty Stöve, also becoming the first champion to have dropped three sets in the championship. She withdrew from the US Open, where she had been seeded fourth, due to a recurring back injury and the early stages of her second pregnancy, although she did play the Lion's Cup (losing to Evert) and the Australian Open championships at the end of the year, despite being four and five months pregnant respectively. Other players, notably Wendy Turnbull, publicly decried the decision by Tennis Australia to pay Goolagong an appearance fee to compete at the Australian Open from 1980 onwards. Goolagong defended the decision to accept the fees to compete in her later autobiography.

Goolagong was then absent for almost all of 1981, returning to tournament play in Australia towards the end of the year and after losing in the first round in Perth, she reached the quarterfinals of the only other two tournaments she played for the year, losing to Evert in Sydney, and at the Australian Open to Navratilova. Her comeback wasn't consistent and she didn't play again until March 1982 when she pushed Evert to three sets and beat reigning French Open champion Hana Mandlikova in the Citizen Cup played on clay in March 1982.

Goolagong then lost her first matches of all her next three tournaments; pulling out in the final set of the Family Circle Cup to Joanne Russell; losing to Pam Teeguarden at the Dow Classic and at Wimbledon 1982, where she was given a protected seeding of 16th by the All England Club, losing her only match to Zina Garrison. For the remainder of the year, Cawley played little, but did win two of her three matches in the Federation Cup. Cawley didn't play competitively again until November when she lost in the first round to Sue Barker in Brisbane, but reached her only singles final at Sydney, where after beating world no.3 Andrea Jaeger, she lost in three sets to Navratilova. She followed this with a three-set loss to Candy Reynolds in the last 32 of the Australian Open. Despite the lack of play, Cawley ended the year ranked 17th and was given a spot in the WTA season ending championship, where she lost to Pam Shriver.

In 1983, she failed to reach the quarterfinal of any event and played her last Grand Slam singles match at the French Open, were she lost to Evert in the third round. At the Dow Classic in Edgbaston, she lost in the last 16 to Anne White, before withdrawing from Wimbledon. Despite not playing the singles, she partnered Sue Barker in the Wimbledon doubles event, losing in the first round, her last Grand Slam appearance.

A brief return to competitive play came in 1985, when in May 1985, Goolagong accepted an invitation to compete at the Australian Indoor Championship, played on carpet. She lost her only match to another Australian veteran, Amanda Tobin Evans.

She is the only mother to have won the Wimbledon title since Dorothea Lambert Chambers in 1914. Married to Roger Cawley in 1975, she had a daughter in 1977.

Goolagong reached four consecutive US Open singles finals, from 1973 to 1976, but lost them all. She is the only player in U.S. Championships history to have lost four consecutive finals. Goolagong made seven consecutive finals at the Australian Open, winning three titles in a row. Despite reaching the final at her first two appearances in 1971 and 1972, after 1973 Goolagong did not compete at the Roland Garros for a decade. The French Tennis Federation banned all World Team Tennis contracted players from the 1974 event, with the player's unions instigating legal action against the French authorities. As Jimmy Connors and Goolagong were the reigning Australian Open champions, they spearheaded the legal action as they were being deprived of the opportunity to attain the tennis calendar Grand Slam as a result of the decision. Connors admitted this was a huge distraction and later wrote both he and Goolagong were "hung out to dry". Goolagong boycotted the event even after the ban was lifted, but returned in 1983 for her final Grand Slam singles appearance. She lost in the last thirty-two to Chris Evert and did not compete in any further Grand Slam singles events. Her last appearance at Grand Slam level came at the following 1983 Wimbledon Championships when she partnered Sue Barker to a first-round defeat in the doubles, having withdrawn from the singles event earlier.

Her career win/loss percentage was 81.0% (704–165). Her win/loss performance in all Grand Slam singles tournaments was 82.1% (133–29), at the French Open 84.2% (16–3), at Wimbledon 83.3% (50–10), at the US Open 81.3% (26–6), and at the Australian Open 80.4% (41–10).

Goolagong was ranked No. 1 in the world in women's tennis for two weeks in 1976, but it was not reported at the time because incomplete data was used to calculate the rankings. This was discovered in December 2007, 31 years later. She was the second woman to hold the top spot, but the 16th at the time she was finally recognised.

Life after touring
Beginning during her playing days, Goolagong endorsed many products and appeared in numerous television and print commercials, extending these further once she retired from competitive play. Her various commercials included KFC (in which she appeared with her husband Roger), Geritol and Sears, where she also promoted her own sports clothing brand 'Go Goolagong'.

A one-off return to competitive action came at the 1985 Australian Indoor Championship organised by the ITF, but Goolagong lost her only match.

In 1988, she was inducted into the International Tennis Hall of Fame.

In 1990, Goolagong began to play in senior invitational competitions, returning to Wimbledon to compete in the inaugural ladies senior invitational doubles, alongside compatriot Kerry Melville Reid.

Goolagong spent some time as a touring professional at the Hilton Head Racquet Club in South Carolina before returning to Australia.

Goolagong was a member of the Board of the Australian Sports Commission from 1995 to 1997 and since 1997 has held the position of Sports Ambassador to Aboriginal and Torres Strait Islander Communities. She was appointed captain of the Australian Fed Cup team in 2002. In 2003, she was the winner for the Oceania region of the International Olympic Committee's 2003 "Women and Sports Trophy". She also runs an annual "Goolagong National Development Camp", with the aim of encouraging Aboriginal children to stay in school through playing competitive tennis.

Awards and recognition

Goolagong was awarded Australian of the Year in 1971. She was appointed a Member of the Order of the British Empire in 1972 and made an Officer of the Order of Australia in 1982.  In 1985 she was inducted into the Sport Australia Hall of Fame. In 1988, Goolagong was inducted into the International Tennis Hall of Fame. In 2018, she was advanced to a Companion of the Order of Australia "for eminent service to tennis as a player at the national and international level, as an ambassador, supporter and advocate for the health, education and wellbeing of young Indigenous people through participation in sport, and as a role model".

In 1972, she played in a segregated South African tournament. To spare her the discrimination experienced by non-whites, the South African authorities classified her as an honorary white.

In 1978 and 1980, she was awarded the WTA Sportsmanship Award.

The Evonne Goolagong Cawley Trophy, awarded to the female champion at the Brisbane International, is named in her honour.

In 1993, the State Transit Authority named a RiverCat ferry in Sydney after her. This rivercat travels daily from Parramatta to Circular Quay.

The National Museum of Australia holds the Evonne Goolagong Cawley collection of memorabilia. This includes her 1971 and 1980 Wimbledon singles trophies, the trophy from her 1974 doubles win and two racquets used in these tournaments. The museum's collection also includes a signed warm-up jacket and a dress with a bolero style top designed by Ted Tinling in the early 1970s.

In 2001, Goolagong was inducted into the Victorian Honour Roll of Women for her achievements as a tennis player.

Goolagong unveiled the exact scale model of the wooden Dunlop racquet during Barellan's centenary celebrations on 3 October 2009.

In February 2016, Goolagong and ten other Australian tennis players were honoured by Australia Post as the recipients of the 2016 Australia Post Legends Award and appeared on a postage stamp set named Australian Legends of Singles Tennis.

In April 2016, Goolagong was awarded an honorary doctorate from the University of South Australia in recognition of her distinguished service to the community.

In June 2018, the International Tennis Federation (ITF) presented her with its highest accolade, the Philippe Chatrier Award for her contributions to tennis.

Goolagong is generally regarded as one of the all-time greats of women's tennis.

Personal life
When Victor Edwards became her coach, Goolagong went to live with him and his family. He became her legal guardian as well as her coach and manager. Goolagong later revealed that Edwards made sexual advances to her. When she met former junior British tennis player Roger Cawley in 1971, her relationship with Edwards became strained, but she was legally tied to Edwards, who controlled every aspect of her career and finances until her marriage to Cawley on 19 June 1975. Goolagong severed all contact with Edwards at that point, although he remained her official coach for Wimbledon 1975. During the tournament, Edwards sat on the opposite side of the players' box from Roger Cawley at her matches, and he and his protégée  were no longer on speaking terms. Cawley became her coach, hitting partner and manager from the time they married. Following her wedding, she settled in Naples, Florida.

Goolagong's father Ken was killed in a car crash in 1974, shortly after Edwards had refused to release any of her money to purchase a new family vehicle when requested. Her mother Melinda died in 1991. Intrigued by meeting so many Indigenous Australian relatives for the first time at the funeral, the Cawleys bought a home in Noosa Heads, Queensland and settled there with their two United States-born children. Her daughter Kelly (born 1977) helps run her tennis camps, and her son Morgan Kiema Cawley (born 1981) was a National Soccer League player. Goolagong is also the maternal great aunt of National Rugby League player Latrell Mitchell, born Latrell Goolagong.

Goolagong's brother, Ian, was a gifted amateur tennis player who never pursued the sport professionally, but he partnered with Evonne in the mixed doubles tournament at Wimbledon in 1982 (the pair lost their only match). , Ian Goolagong was the president and coach at the Lalor Tennis Club in Victoria.

Autobiography
Goolagong Cawley, Evonne; Jarrett, Phil (1993). Home! the Evonne Goolagong story. Simon & Schuster. ISBN 0731803817.

In the arts and popular culture
A play based on the life of Goolagong Cawley called Sunshine Super Girl, written and directed by Andrea James, was to have premièred with the Melbourne Theatre Company in 2020, but the event was cancelled owing to the COVID-19 pandemic in Australia. Instead, it premiered in Griffith, New South Wales, in October 2020 before a run at the Sydney Festival in January 2021, produced by Performing Lines.

Career statistics

Grand Slam tournament performance timeline

Note: The Australian Open was held twice in 1977, in January and December. Goolagong won the December edition. She was seeded fourth for the 1980 US Open Championships, but withdrew from the tournament before play began.

Grand Slam tournament finals

Singles: 18 (7–11)

Women's doubles: 6 (5–1)

Note:  The shared women's doubles title at the Australian Open in 1977 (December) isn't traditionally counted in Goolagong's win total because the finals were never played.  Otherwise, she would have 14 Grand Slam titles, 6 Grand Slam women's doubles titles, and 7 Grand Slam women's doubles finals.
Evonne Cawley is occasionally credited incorrectly with winning the 1977 Ladies Doubles event at Wimbledon, due to the confusion regarding the married name of her compatriot Helen Gourlay who in fact took the trophy. Both women were listed in tournaments as Mrs. R. Cawley (Goolagong was Mrs. R.A.Cawley and Gourlay Mrs. R.L.Cawley). Goolagong Cawley did not participate at Wimbledon 1977.

Mixed doubles: 2 (1–1)

Records
 These records were attained in the Open Era of tennis.
 Records in bold indicate peer-less achievements.

Footnotes
  Margaret Osborne duPont and Althea Gibson also hold these records; however, they attained those in the pre-Open Era.
 The Australian Open was held twice in 1977, in January and December. Goolagong Cawley did not play in the January edition but made the final in the December tournament.

See also

 List of female tennis players
 Tennis performance timeline comparisons

References

External links

 
 
 
 
 

1951 births
Australian female tennis players
Australian Members of the Order of the British Empire
Australian Open (tennis) champions
Australian Open (tennis) junior champions
Companions of the Order of Australia
French Open champions
Grand Slam (tennis) champions in women's singles
Grand Slam (tennis) champions in women's doubles
Grand Slam (tennis) champions in mixed doubles
Grand Slam (tennis) champions in girls' singles
Indigenous Australian tennis players
International Tennis Hall of Fame inductees
Living people
People from Griffith, New South Wales
Sport Australia Hall of Fame inductees
Tennis people from New South Wales
Wimbledon champions
Wiradjuri people
WTA number 1 ranked singles tennis players